Young Hyacinth is a prequel to the British sitcom Keeping Up Appearances, written by original writer Roy Clarke. Keeping Up Appearances ran for 44 episodes in five series from 1990 to 1995 and two TV specials in 1997 and 2008, created and written by Roy Clarke. The one-off special, set some forty years before the events of Keeping Up Appearances, follows the early life of Hyacinth Walton (later Bucket), as she desperately attempts to better her sisters and dad. The special premiered on 2 September 2016 on BBC One as part of the BBC Landmark Sitcom Season.

Cast
 Kerry Howard as Hyacinth Walton 
 Mark Addy as Daddy
 Tamla Kari as Violet Walton
 Katherine Pearce as Daisy Walton
 Katie Redford as Rose Walton
 Tony Gardner as Claude
 Debra Stephenson as Dulcie
 Tim Downie as Freddy
 James Wrighton as William

Summary
In the late 1950s, a young Hyacinth Walton is working as a domestic servant for the Cooper-Smiths by day while living in a small canal cottage with her alcoholic father and three sisters (Violet, Rose and Daisy). Impressed by her eccentric employers, Hyacinth vows to escape her poor background and enter a world of the elegant upper class.

Broadcast
The show was broadcast on 2 September 2016 on BBC One in the United Kingdom and 4.14 million viewers watched the show within seven days of its broadcast, making it the 22nd most watched BBC One show for the week ending September 4. 4.39 million viewers watched the show within 28 days of its initial broadcast.

References

External links
 
 

2016 television films
BBC high definition shows
BBC television comedy
BBC television sitcoms
English-language television shows
Prequel television series
Television series set in the 1950s
Television series by BBC Studios